Herb Bushler (born March 7, 1939, New York City) is an American jazz bassist. He plays both double bass and electric bass.

Bushler played piano and tuba in his youth before picking up double bass; he is classically trained in bass and has performed with symphony orchestras in this capacity. In 1966 he began a longtime association with ballet and film composer Coleridge-Taylor Perkinson. He worked extensively in jazz idioms in the 1960s and 1970s, including with David Amram, Ted Curson, Blossom Dearie, Tony Williams, and Paul Winter. He first played with Gil Evans in 1967, an association that would continue on and off until 1981. Other work in the 1970s included sessions with Enrico Rava, Joe Farrell, Ryo Kawasaki, David Sanborn, and Harold Vick. He played with The Fifth Dimension in the 1960s and has also worked with Dee Dee Bridgewater, Billy Harper, Les McCann, Enrico Rava, Joe Chambers, and Howard Johnson.

References
"Herb Bushler". The New Grove Dictionary of Jazz. 2nd edition, ed. Barry Kernfeld.

1939 births
American jazz double-bassists
Male double-bassists
American jazz bass guitarists
American male bass guitarists
Living people
Musicians from New York (state)
20th-century American bass guitarists
The Tony Williams Lifetime members
21st-century double-bassists
20th-century American male musicians
21st-century American male musicians
American male jazz musicians
Paul Winter Consort members